Onopordum illyricum is a species of thistle known by the common name Illyrian thistle, or Illyrian cottonthistle.  It is native to southwestern Europe, but has been introduced into Australia and California, where it has become a noxious weed.

The plant is a biennial herb producing an erect, branching, winged, spiny stem known to exceed two meters in maximum height.

References

External links
Jepson Manual Treatment
Illyrian Thistle in Victoria
Photo gallery

illyricum
Plants described in 1753
Taxa named by Carl Linnaeus